Günay is a Turkish surname and sometimes first name for males and females. It means a moon, which is seen in daylight. The Azerbaijani equivalent of the name is Günay.

Notable people with the name include:

Given name
 Gunay Aghakishiyeva, Azerbaijani female taekwondo practitioner
 Günay Güvenç (born 1991), Turkish footballer
 Gunay Mehdizade, Azerbaijani painter 
 Gunay Mammadzada, Azerbaijani chess player

Surname
 Ayşegül Günay (born 1992), Turkish female basketball player
 Damla Günay (born 1982), Turkish female archer
 Ertuğrul Günay (born 1948), Turkish politician and former government minister
 İzzet Günay (born 1934), Turkish film and theatre/stage actor

Places
 Günay, Sivrice

Turkish-language surnames